Lapfit is a second screen for laptops introduced by Samsung in February 2009.

These monitors include DisplayLink USB graphics technology to allow a video connection using USB only.

Features 
 USB Plug & Play monitor, specially designed for laptops
 Magic Bright supports one-touch brightness adjustment
 16:9 screen 
 Eco-friendly monitor

Specification

LD190G

LD220G

LD220Z 
1920:1080

See also 
 Samsung

References

External links 
 Lapfit Official Community(Korean)

Liquid crystal displays
Samsung Electronics products